State Highway 364 (SH 364) is a south–north state highway that runs from Interstate 2/U.S. Highway 83 northward to Farm to Market Road 2221 in western Hidalgo County. The route was designated in 2001, replacing Farm to Market Road 2894.

Route description 
SH 364 begins in Palmview at a diamond interchange with I-2/US 83.  The highway heads north from the interchange one block to an intersection with SH 495 (Griffin Parkway).  The highway continues north through Hidalgo County to an intersection with FM 676.  It reaches its northern terminus at an intersection with FM 2221 east of Citrus City.

History 
SH 364 was originally designated as FM 2894 on May 6, 1964 from FM 1924 to FM 2221. The route was redesignated on January 25, 2001 as SH 364 in 2001, and was extended south to connect with what is now Interstate 2/U.S. Route 83, replacing a portion of FM 495.

Major intersections

References

364
Transportation in Hidalgo County, Texas